Diaphania arguta is a moth in the family Crambidae. It was described by Julius Lederer in 1863. It is found in Florida, Mexico, Guatemala, Costa Rica, Panama, Colombia, Venezuela, Trinidad, Tobago, Guyana, French Guiana, Suriname, Brazil, Peru and Bolivia.

The length of the forewings is 7.5–9 mm for males and 8.5-9.3 mm for females. The forewings are brown with a light-purple gloss and a white light-purple oval band in the disc parallel to the external margin, with fine extensions at the base and apex. The hindwings have a transparent triangular area.

References

Moths described in 1863
Diaphania